Electoral district of Dromana was an electoral district of the Legislative Assembly in the Australian state of Victoria from 1967 to 2002.

Members for Dromana

Election results

References

Former electoral districts of Victoria (Australia)
1967 establishments in Australia
2002 disestablishments in Australia